Novotel Saint Petersburg Centre (Russian: Новотель Санкт-Петербург Центр) is a 4-star hotel that operates under the brand Novotel by Accor Group. It was opened in 2005. The hotel is located at 3 Mayakovskogo ul., Saint Petersburg, Russia. Every room in the hotel has a different shape due to the complicated nature of the building architecture.

Location
The hotel is located in the historical centre of the city, at 3 Mayakovskogo ul., 100 metres from Nevsky Prospect – the main street of Saint Petersburg.

History
The Novotel Saint Petersburg Centre complex was constructed in 2004, part of a municipal renovation project known as 'Quartier (city block) 130'. The project included dividing the city block into four spaces, each one to be occupied by a separate building, every building designed in its own way but all of them united by one architectural doctrine. Two such spaces were sold to Accor Hotels, and a two-building complex was built. The hotel itself opened for business in 2005.

Architectural project
The project was developed as a part of complex development plan. The Quartier 130 ensemble draws largely from classical Italian architecture, Renaissance being one of the main themes. The hotel complex consists of two buildings connected via a 3-storey gallery. The hotel is inspired by traditional Roman architecture.

Facilities
The 9-storey hotel offers 233 rooms (including 16 suites).

References

Hotels in Saint Petersburg
Hotel buildings completed in 2005
Hotels established in 2005
Saint Petersburg Centre